This is a list of fictional characters from the manga Cage of Eden.

Main characters

Akira's childhood friend, although at 15 she has very large breasts. Rion is the school's "idol" and the star of the gymnastics team. She has feelings for Akira since childhood, but does not want to admit it. She would take care of him, drag him to school, help him with homework and look out for him. After the crash, she went into hiding from the chaos that came over the survivors. She was later found by Akira and has followed him since. She is quick witted, a good actor, self-sacrificing and very flexible, allowing her to attack in angles that no one thought possible. Whenever a smaller group is formed for recon, she is always a member. She is frequently jealous when some other girl shows affection for Akira.

A teenage prodigy who carries a laptop which contain facts about prehistoric fauna and flora. He was ranked first in his class for nine years running. He is very stoic, usually attempting to kill his emotions, to make the logical decisions. Thanks to his encyclopedias, intelligence and wit, he is the group's strategist when he helps Sengoku in his plans and acts as his second command. He carries around a portable charger for his laptop. His stoicism is because he has lost his mother, and attempted to hide his pain by wearing an unfeeling mask. But as a result he had little friends before the crash, and slightly wished to like Sengoku to have many friends. After a fight with Zaji, he realizes that he should stop wearing the mask and start thinking of his friends as well. He is later announced as Sengoku's second in command.

Akira's best friend. He was at first bullied by everyone until Sengoku stood up for him, and he became popular by the end of the year. the star of the volleyball team, and very popular with girls, he tried to keep up the mood of the survivors, but after learning they could not go home, he snapped and killed the pilot in his rage. Kouhei originally led a large group of survivors, but was haunted by his sin and wished for Sengoku to help him, despite thinking that he was dead. He slowly sinks into murderous paranoia after suffering a serious head injury and starts killing the survivors and make the remaining 4 insane murderers like him. After getting into a conflict with Sengoku, he regrets his actions, and attempts to atone by helping Sengoku's group escape a flash flood inside a cave and is presumed to have died when he stayed behind. In truth, he went away to find out on how to pay for his murders. Only one other person aside from Hades is aware that he is still alive: Yuki.

An air stewardess who joins Akira's group. She is very knowledgeable in first aid, although she is also quite clumsy. She has low self-confidence, but only has pride in her large bust. While at first she was easily scared, even from the harmless Ptilodus (who are revealed to actually like her), eventually she becomes courageous, going as far as taking a stab from Kouhei. She grew to be rather close to Zaji and took her some time to overcome his death.

A loner student well-known for violence. He is very powerful, the best fighter of the series, and at the same time very intelligent. He has advanced knowledge of science. He is focused on understanding the island's mystery, and sees Sengoku as his first friend. It is hinted that he is in love with Kurusu. Since his father had many lovers and wasn't interested in him, he was raised by his mother alone until she died when he was six. His aunt, his mom's younger sister took care of him, until she died in a car accident, turning him into the lonely and violent person that everyone knows. His concern for Kurusu was so great that he was even willing on murder Akira under Nishikori's orders in order to save her, until he realized he couldn't kill his friend. He overcame his depression thanks to Mami. After Kurusu recovered, he began to carry her around all the time.

A tanned teenager. He comes from a broken family, where everyone ignores him. He does not do well in school, and has no friends his age. While perverted, Kazuma has a strong loyalty to his friends whom he considers like his own family. During the series, he begins to fall for Oomori, but is rejected when he finally confesses. Soon after, he gets injured during a fight with some of the island's animals. Realizing he is dying, he chooses to fall off a cliff in order to not make Oomori suffer emotionally, nor to become a burden to the rest of the group, making the entire group depressed over his death.

Sengoku's group

Class President of Sengoku's class and a member of his group. She was originally a part of Kouhei Arita's group and is the only remaining survivor of the group, besides himself. She is very intelligent and is known for giving out various historic facts. She likes bears and has an interest in premonitions. She has a crush on Sengoku, but decides not to tell him since she knows he likes Rion.

A mischievous, crossdressing boy who disguises himself as Miina Isurugi, the granddaughter of billionaire Yoshimi Isurugi and heir to the Isurugi Conglomerate. Despite being a boy, everyone mostly refers to him as a "she". Akira and his group first meet "her" after being brought to "her" camp where she rules a group of defenseless men with three Yakuza gangsters as her bodyguards and enforcers. In truth, Miina is using the Yakuza not to rule the camp but to protect "herself" as Miina had witnessed the men in "her" camp rape and accidentally killed a woman named Towa, an air stewardess and colleague of Kanako. Although small, Miina is smart and strong, and is able to use "her" natural abilities as a lolita to manipulate others. His real name is Heijirou(平治郎, Heijirou).

A mysterious girl, the real granddaughter and heir of the billionaire Isurugi. She claims to have amnesia, carries around a sketchbook with extremely accurate depictions of the island's wildlife, and knows the details of their physiology. The fake Miina's appearance is very similar to hers, although her hair color is dark. Her name is carved onto a tower in the center of the island. It is possible she developed feelings for Heijirou, her body double, since "she" saved her on more than one occasion.

An intellectual individual who was also the student school council president for two years in a row. He was the leader of his own group before meeting Sengoku Akira and had effectively created a small base before meeting with Sengoku's Group. Yamaguchi has a lot of charisma considering he easily got a large group to follow his plan to create a school within their situation. He seems to have feelings for Yuki.

One of the girls originally part of Yamaguchi's Group. She is a tough girl who has shown exceptional skill in her abilities to fight. She is also the childhood friend of Zaji Kazuma and is very upset after his death. Miyauchi grew up in a dojo and trained vigorously in karate, eventually becoming a second dan. She is a skilled and confident warrior, able to smash various targets to pieces with her kicks, and has such control she could lash out a leg toward's someone's head and stop abruptly before making contact. Miyauchi's fighting skills make her a valuable member of her group, as she is not afraid to fight even ferocious beasts. Despite her skills, she does have a hard time against animals, especially when they can shrug off her attacks, and she's also very terrified of insects.

A 20-year-old college student who was traveling with her friends Kotomi and Tooru. She's a tomboy with tanned skin who's always wearing only a bikini top, a jacket and mini shorts. She has an upbeat and caring personality, but she's also highly perverted and prone to giving fake advice to the other girls. She has a younger brother who she is very close to, which is why she is worried about Miina(Fake)'s attempts at being alone, since her brother had gone through a similar thing. She also went to the same high school as most of the main cast.

A 20 year-old college student and Rei's childhood friend. While sometimes weary, he's rather open and friendly, always looking out for the group's well-being and speaking frankly about problems. He's always looking out for Rei. His face was scarred by an Arctodus and hid his face underneath bandages until Kotomi died.

A high-schooler who has clairvoyant abilities, being able to predict the events in the near future. She has a shy personality and is one of the few passengers that didn't attend the same school as the rest of the main cast. Her group was originally led by her manager and a gym instructor, who killed some members of Akira's group in order to make them believe her predictions. She later had an actual premonition but no one in her group believed her and, as a result, they were eaten by pristichampsus. She would have been killed herself if Akira hadn't saved her in time. She now occasionally has premonitions that involve the survivors, but she can't be sure if it will come true or not.

The younger twin brother of Airi, whom he has a very deep connection. He has a lot of knowledge about dark stories. He accompanies Sengoku in his mission to the pyramid.

The older twin sister of Kairi, whom she has a very deep connection, to the point of knowing the exact spot where her other twin is.

A perverted and lecherous student who attempts to manipulate others and possesses an incredible luck, which is why he always ends up as part of some dangerous mission or being attacked by animals, as either a decoy or as bait. The girls dislike him for his perversion and Akira doesn't fully trust him ever since the time he tried to rape Rion.

Originally a member of Yamaguchi's group, she's the former vice president of the school student council and has eidetic memory, giving her near perfect memorization. She accompanies Akira in the mission to the pyramid, and notices several things that allows the group to eventually solve the island's mysteries.

A former member of the Kendo club and Momoka Kirino's childhood friend. Despite his proficiency at kendo, he has an inferiority complex. He tries to leave Akira to be killed by the Gigantopithecus, but when Akira and the others escape safely, Sengoku forgives him, although he punches him in the face. He's killed by a smilodon while trying to protect Asuka Takahashi.

A former member of the Kendo club and Shuu's childhood friend, who was also kidnapped by the Gigantopithecus and watched one of her friends die at the hands of the giant ape. She comes to resent Asuka for surviving instead of Shuu, but she eventually forgives her.

A member of the group whose only notorious ability is singing, although she's hardworking. She accompanies Shuu to gather water for the group after the animals' attack, but they're attacked by a smilodon and he sacrifices himself to save her. She manages to lift everyone's spirit with her song.

Morita's group

Known as Eiken, he's one of Akira Sengoku's closest classmates and aspires to be a photographer. He survived on the island thanks to the help of the people around him. He's a short boy whose bangs always cover his eyes.

A strong, independent and stoic female, she's the first person that begins to travel with Makoto. She's extremely athletic and used to be part of the track and field club during school. She doesn't talk much, but she's able to fight effectively without remorse and hates to lose. Her weak point is her lower back, and threatened to kill Ryouichi if he touched her there again.

A perverted lolicon who was forced by his parents to take on the ways of a monk because of a scandal when he worked at the City Council. Despite his pervertedness, he has useful skills and can also give good advice.

The oldest person in Makoto's group, who's rather slothful and unhelpful to the group since he was a rather successful business man and had a lot of workers working under him.

Yarai's group

One of the teachers going on the trip, she knows about Yarai's past and acts as a mother figure towards him, hinting she has feelings for him. Despite being rather clumsy and naive, she cares deeply for her students. During an attack from a chalicotherium, she got injured and began to bleed internally, which led Yarai into asking Nishikori's help, who would only operate on her if he killed Akira. When Nishikori was defeated and revealed he wasn't a doctor, everyone lost hope and Yarai was even willing to operate on her himself, until they managed to convince Junichi Mutou, the real doctor, to successfully operate her.

A strong-willed girl with pink hair who's part of a refined, rich family. She's the number 2 idol in school after Rion. While at first she hated Yarai for rejecting her love letter back at school, it turned out it was just a big misunderstanding, and she eventually fell in love with him, while also seeing Kurusu as her rival. While trying to be useful for the group, she caught an anomalochelys with the intention of eating it, only to later take it as a pet, calling it Mr. Lucky.

A girl with glasses.

A girl with a ponytail.

Other survivors

A mysterious student who wears a mask he bought in Guam. His true goals and identity are a mystery and tends to appear out of nowhere. He manipulated Kouhei into starting killing for no reason, and later saved him from drowning on a whim. It is implied that he discovered that the students have been sent into the future and went mad, resulting in him giving into any whim that crosses his mind as there are no more consequences. His fate at the end of the series is unknown.

A man who looks like a Yakuza, but it turns out he's an adventure novelist. He first appears alongside Junichi escaping from Nishikori's tyranny, and later guides the students to the pyramid, but refuses to go back. His researches for his books prove to be useful to the survivors.

A man accompanying Yashiro, who at first only seemed to be a physical therapist, until the group found out that he is a surgeon. Five years ago, his 10-year-old son suffered a car accident and he had to operate him, but because of exhaustion, he committed a mistake and his son died, making him unable to hold a scalpel. He recovers the will to be a doctor thanks to some rough motivation from Yashiro and the support of everyone in the group, successfully operating Motoko, saving the teacher's life.

The leader of the pyramid group, who pretended to be a doctor, since he knows about pressure points, diseases and drugs, in order to make the other survivors his slaves. Manipulative, misogynistic and with a complete lack of empathy, he controls people with psychological tricks and by taking advantage of the men's lust. He rose to power when the rest of the group fell ill and he claimed to have the only cure, leaving to die the former leader and his daughter, laughing the entire time. He wanted to kill Akira for scratching his face and manipulated Yarai into trying kill Akira in exchange for saving Motoko's life. When he was finally defeated, he revealed he isn't even a doctor, he simply worked at a pharmaceutical company. He's allowed to live, but loses a leg in the Paraceratherium's attack.

Another teacher at the trip, who seems to dislike troublemakers. He's a perverted chemistry teacher who has blown up his classroom on more than one occasion, and for some reason, none of the students wonder why he wasn't fired.

Island's creatures

Diatryma
One of the first creatures encountered by Akira, taking Kanako to its nest, until Sengoku, Mariya and Oomori manage to escape from it. Another Diatryma appears later, only to be killed by a Smilodon. It is revealed at the end of the series that it is one of the first creatures that was successfully recreated.

Ptilodus
A small, harmless, squirrel-like animal that takes a liking towards Kanako, occasionally surrounding her.

Smilodon
The sabre-toothed cat, that first appears fighting and killing a Diatryma. A pair of them are later seen killing a Macrauchenia. A pride appears later alongside the Titanis and Propleopus to attack the survivors' base at the Tower and one of them kills Shuu Hikime when he tries to get water. Akira and Aya scare off the pride by breaking the fragile teeth of one of its members.

Andrewsarchus
The biggest carnivorous land mammal on the island, that attacks the plane attracted by the fire, devouring several passengers. He reappears at the beach, crushing a Meiolania's shell like nothing. It devours Masanori Tanaka, but finds itself in pain when accidentally eats some of Masanori's instant glue, making it leave the beach.

Megatherium
The biggest sloth in history. A group of them appears to feed from the trees near where the plane landed, shaking and damaging it while Mariya, Rion and Oomori were still inside. Akira scares them off by setting the plane's fuel on fire.

Ambulocetus
A primitive whale that lives like a seal or a crocodile. It first appears trying to drown Rion, but Akira scares it away when he rips some of its whiskers, making it swim away. It is later seen stalking Kanako and Zaji while they were saving Mariya from drowning.

Basilosaurus
A huge, serpent-like whale. Mina Mukouda and Masakazu Yoshimoto hijacked a raft for themselves and headed towards the 'other island', leaving Akira's group to die, only to find out that it was just a rock. The Basilosaurus then emerged from the water, destroyed the raft and devoured both.

Arsinoitherium
A rhinoceros-like creature related to elephants and dugongs. While at first Akira believed it was docile, it is revealed that this individual was sick, poisoned with the same berries that were killing the survivors. Akira and Rion found the cure in the middle of a herd of them, a flower that neutralizes the poison, but the animals showed their true, aggressive nature when they got too close. Akira and Rion are saved from being trampled by Yarai.

Megaladapis
A huge lemur. A group of them appears when Ono, Itou and Mikoshiba (members of Yarai's first group) were bullying a baby, and Yarai fought them off until they recovered the youngster. One of them was still attacking Akira, which caused Yarai to start laughing at him, surprising everyone, including the lemur.

Nemegtbaatar
A cretaceous, mouse-like animal that eats the same poisonous berries as the Arsinoitherium, and also neutralizes it with the same flowers. Rion and Akira followed it to a herd of Arsinoitherium, where they found the cure.

Entelodon
The Pigs from Hell. A herd of them appears in stampede and they cause Akira and Oomori to separate from the group. The herd returns attracted by the smell of blood, killing several of the men that had killed Towa, but they got into a fight with a pack of Hyaenodons.

Hyaenodon
The rivals of the entelodonts. A large pack appeared attracted by the blood and carnage caused by the entelodonts and the murder of Miina's bodyguards, killing the other survivors and even fighting the entelondons for food. One of them finds Shinzou Karino, the man who had led the gang rape and murder of Towa, and ate him.

Dire Wolf
A pack of them is led by a scarred individual that Akira nicknames Ernest. Akira and his exploration party end up in their territory and find themselves in the middle of a fight between the wolves and the short-faced bears, with the wolves refusing to back down since Ernest's mate was pregnant. Akira's group and the pack of wolves reach to a some sort of understanding about not harming each other and they work together to scare off the Arctodus. Ernest later saves Akira by leading the others where he had fallen from a cliff.

Arctodus
The short-faced bear. One of them scarred Tooru and Akira's exploration party found themselves in the middle of a territorial fight between a trio of bears and the pack of dire wolves. The wolves and the survivors scare them away by attacking their noses, the most sensitive part of their bodies.

Argentavis
The biggest flying bird in history. A flock appears to attack the survivor's base and one nearly kills Suzuki. While the survivors manage to scare them away temporarily, it turned out they carried poisonous ticks that killed some of the students. The flock returned to attack when the survivors were washing the ticks off at the river, but Mariya realized that their bones are weaker than they appear, and when Maya killed one of them, the flock fled at the sight of their dead comrade.

Chalicotherium
A relative of the horse with a gorilla-like body and long claws. Despite being herbivores, they're really aggressive. A trio of them attacks Yarai and Saki when they intrude in their feeding grounds, and one injures Kurusu. Yarai scares them away by breaking the claw of one of them.

Pristichampsus
A crocodile with long legs, adapted to hunt on land, hence why it isn't a good swimmer. A large group is let into the plateau were Akira's group was staying by Kyouko Nakayama, Mami's manager, who wanted to kill them, but the crocodiles devoured her and most of her group instead, with the only exemption being Mami herself. The group manages to escape from them by going to the river.

Gigantopithecus
The biggest ape in history. A family kidnaps Oomori and Kirino to be used as practice prey for their youngster. One of them easily killed an Eusmilus with its strength and intelligence. When Mariya decided to help Zaji escape from them, they realized that the apes had already encountered other survivors, and one of them fatally injures Zaji. Mariya, Zaji and Miyauchi scare them away by setting on fire a Nerium oleander, a plant whose poisonous smoke makes them flee.

Titanis
The terror bird. This birds became capable of imitating human voices like parrots, and all they say is "help me" after hearing it many times from its victims. A flock comes to attack the survivors at their base at The Tower alongside the Propleopus and the Smilodon, and one of them tries to eat Suzuki, only to spit him out. Tokiwa and Sengoku bring them down by taking advantage of their inability to make sharp turns and some are finished off by the Smilodons.

Propleopus
Carnivorous kangaroos. A group comes to attack the survivors alongside the Titanis and the Smilodon. While Akira and Tokiwa were away taking care of the Smilodon and the Titanis, the kangaroos return to attack the survivors. Akira manages to lure them to the trap hole in the Tower, making them fall to their deaths.

Rodhocetus
A primitive whale between Ambulocetus and Basilosaurus. A group attacks Yarai's group when they're investigating the Lighthouse, and one of them manages to get inside and tries to attack Saki, but she's saved in time by Kouichi.

Chimera
A monstrous failed experiment that was hibernating underneath The Tower and awakened when the trap holes surrounding it where unearthed. It looks like a gigantic, three-headed Smilodon with an armored back, human-like arms, and an incredibly long tongue. It has a 360° field of vision thanks to its six eyes, but a terrible depth perception and color distinction. It swallows Miina(Fake) whole, but Mariya deduces its organs still don't work properly because of the hibernation, so the group manages to save "her" by stabbing it in the stomach until it collapses, and its then finished off by Akira and Kouichi.

Chimera II
A second failed experiment that awakened alongside the first one, and was dragged back to the trap hole by Kouhei in order to let Akira and his group kill the first Chimera. It looks like a demon, with ram-like horns, an anteater-like tail and goat legs, capable of leaping great lengths. Kouhei blinds it and later breaks one of its horns, until he's able to kill it.

Paraceratherium
The biggest land mammal that has ever lived, a gigantic giraffe-like rhinoceros.

Cage of Eden